The Association of Luxemburg Student Unions, abr. ACEL, founded in 1984 is the roofing bond of Luxemburgish student unions and represents more than 40 student unions, all spread across Europe. Therefore, ACEL is representing more than 10000 Luxemburgish students. It is hence considered as the most important student representative in Luxemburg. ACEL is politically non-committed, it represents no party opinion. Claiming to be the representative of all Luxemburgish students, this is particularly important to function properly.

Description 
The major part of Luxemburgish Students study abroad, as the studies offered in Luxemburg are limited and do not cover all academic fields of study. This situation is unique and has several benefits, including the foundation of Luxemburgish Student Unions across various European cities. 
The student unions constitute the active members of ACEL, covering 9 countries; Austria, Belgium, France, Germany, Great Britain, Luxemburg, The Netherlands, Switzerland and the United States. These student unions receive and unite fellow Luxemburgish students during their academic studies. Besides ACEL counts 9 specific student unions among its members (Medicine, Economics, Law, Psychology, Literature, Engineering, History, Communication and BTS students ).

Since its foundation, ACEL has defined its own purposes:
 The Information of the Luxemburgish students and the future students
 The Pooling of Luxemburgish Students, abroad or in Luxemburg
 The Representation of the Luxemburgish students and defense of their rights on national as well as on international political stage

Student Unions

Specific 
 ALEM Medical students
 ALEP Psychology students
 ANEIL Engineering students
 ANELD Association nationale des Etudiants luxembourgeois en Droit
 ANESEC Association nationale des Etudiants en Sciences Econmiques
 elSiC Etudiants luxembourgeois en Sciences de l'Information et de la Communication
 Historic.ul Association des Etudiants en Histoire de l'Université du Luxembourg
 Jonk BAD Librarianship students
 LBS BTS students

Countries

Austria 
 LSI Innsbruck
 LSW Vienna

Belgium 
 CELB Brussels
 CELBas Bastogne
 LESTLE Liège
 Nei-Leiwener Louvain-la-Neuve

France 
 AELP Paris
 ALUS Strasbourg 
 CELG Grenobel
 CELM Montpellier
 ELAN Nancy
 Letz'Aix Aix-en-Provence

Germany 
 AELK Karlsruhe
 ALESONTIA Bonn
 AVL Aachen
 LSB Bingen
 LSC Cologne
 LSD Düsseldorf
 LSH Heidelberg
 LSHH Hamburg
 LSK Kaiserslautern
 LSM Munich
 LSRM Rhein-Main 
 LSS Saarbrücken
 LST Treves
 LSWü Würzburg
 SLUF Freiburg
 VLIB Berlin

Great-Britain 
 LSA Aberdeen
 SLSB Students in Great Britain

Luxemburg 
 CEFT Belval
 CEST Science-, Technology- and Communication- Students
 LSU Differdange

Netherlands 
 LSNL Students in the Netherlands

Switzerland 
 AELL Lausanne
 Friblëtz Fribourg
 LSBe Bern
 LSSG St. Gallen
 LSZ Zurich

United States 
 LUAM Miami University, Oxford

Others 
 aAcel Alumni of ACEL
 REEL Organisational committee of the REEL

Information 
One of the main goals of ACEL is to inform the students. In order to do so, ACEL publishes yearly its Guide of the future Graduate, which aims to facilitate student's entry onto the job market. Furthermore, ACEL also tries to inform the future students and this via its Guide of the future Student. Published first in 1987, it appears yearly in September and delivers practical information on the different cities and their universities. It is realized together with ACEL's different member unions and tries to answer questions related to housing, registration and what to look out for in general as a student. The Guide of the future Graduate, published first in 1999, pools all the necessary information for a successful entry upon the job market. It is published annually in the autumn with the Guide of the future student.
Both guides are free and retrievable from ACEL itself and the CEDIES.

Besides the 2 Guides, ACEL also publishes its Zoom, which is published yearly for the Student fair. This publication consists of a review of the ongoing academic year and the activities of ACEL. Within one encounters the experiences and the different projects of the member student unions, as well as information concerning the latter.

ACEL presents itself is an informational booklet on the different activities of ACEL and its main goals.

Besides its publications, ACEL participates in the different study fairs organized by the Luxemburgish secondary schools and tries to answer the pupils' questions regarding their future academic studies.

Furthermore, ACEL also organizes yearly its Student for one day. During these day trips to different cities and their universities, which are organized together with ACEL's member unions, pupils get the chance to have a first hands on experience of the different cities, the universities, the student unions as well as the various fields of studies. The choices taken by the pupils during their last year of secondary school may define their future and ACEL tries to give them a deep insight into the life as a student during the Student for one day.

Pooling 
The information and the political representation of the Luxemburgish students are ACEL's defining goals, but those two wouldn't be achievable without the aid of its member unions. In order to maintain the positive relation between ACEL and its members, the pooling pillar tries to regroup Luxemburgish students as well in Luxemburg as abroad.
This goal is achieved via different events throughout the academic year

De Studentebal 
The Students' Ball is unique in its nature. Thanks to its organizational form, it has established itself as the biggest open air student ball in Luxemburg. Together with ACEL, more than 20 of its member unions are present and propose the different typical drinks of their cities of study in a creatively designed environment. The event enables the Luxemburgish student, who throughout the academic year are spread across Europe, to get together. The different member unions participate in the raising and the truing of the site and the benefice is fairly divided among the participating students unions. With the generated profit the different student unions are able to propose different activities to their members in the following year.

Tournoi de Noël / Christmas Tournament 
During the Christmas Holiday, the different member unions of ACEL compete each other in a sports tournament, which includes football, basketball and volleyball. The ranks on the campus  Geesseknäppchen in Luxemburg-city are always filled. Even if the competing teams always give their fullest, amusement and sportsmanship are the most important traits of the tournament. 
ACEL takes care of the organizational aspects of the championship and the LASEL ( the Luxemburgish secondary school sports federation ) organizes the athletic aspects of the tournament. The generated profit is contributed as donation to a good cause.

Intercercles and balls 
Throughout the academic year, the student unions organize various events with different activities. During an event, a so-called intercercle, the organizing student union offers for example a cultural activity or a culinary one for which it invites the other student unions of ACEL to join.
The background idea is to create get-togethers for students. ACEL offers sponsoring to the organizing student unions.

Representation 
As important as the information and the pooling of the students is their political representation and the defence of their rights on the national as well as on an international level. Within this political context, ACEL fosters a constant dialogue with the responsible Ministries, as for example the Ministry of higher education. ACEL also represents its members among the Council on higher education and the Financial Aid Committee.

For several years ACEL invests itself into a constructive dialogue with the Luxemburgish political powers to discuss the themes most mattering for students. It is in this context that ACEL has been able to achieve in 2016 an increase of the financial aid given to the Luxemburgish students by the government.

Furthermore, ACEL has managed to achieve that Luxemburgish students pursuing their studies in France or Germany are freed of paying fees such as the GEZ in Germany or the taxe d'habitation  in France.

References

External links
 Internet site ACEL
 Internet site CEDIES
 Internet site Ministry of Higher Education and Research
 ALEM

Youth organisations based in Luxembourg
Education in Luxembourg